Wuji can refer to:

Wuji (people) (勿吉人), pronounced in ancient times as "Moji or "Merjie", an ancient ethnic group in Manchuria
Wuji (philosophy) (無極), concept in Chinese philosophy and Taoism, as opposed to Taiji (太極 "Great Ultimate")
Wuji (The Promise) (無極), 2005 Chinese film directed by Chen Kaige
Zhangsun Wuji (長孫無忌), Tang Dynasty chancellor

Locations in China 
Wuji County (无极县), Shijiazhuang, Hebei
 Wuji, Hengdong (吴集镇), a town of Hengdong County, Hunan.
Wuji, Huai'an (吴集镇), town in Huaiyin District, Huai'an, Jiangsu
Wuji, Shuyang County (吴集镇), town in Jiangsu
Wuji, Rushan (午极镇), town in Shandong

See also 
 Wu Ji (disambiguation)